Acacia heteroclita is a shrub or tree of the genus Acacia and the subgenus Plurinerves that is endemic to south western Australia.

Description
Like most species of Acacia it has phyllodes rather than true leaves. It blooms from September to December and produces yellow flowers.

Taxonomy
There are two recognised subspecies:
Acacia heteroclita subsp. heteroclita
Acacia heteroclita subsp. valida

Distribution
It is native to an area in the southern Wheatbelt, Great Southern and Goldfields-Esperance regions of Western Australia where it is commonly situated among granite outcrops and slopes, lateritic breakaways and on undulating plains growing in sandy or gravelly granitic soils. It has a scattered and discontinuous from around Kulin in the north down to around the Fitzgerald River National Park in the south and as far east as Cape Le Grand National Park as well as some of the islands in the Recherche Archipelago. It is often a part of mallee, shrubland or heathland communities and can be found in saline areas.

See also
List of Acacia species

References

heteroclita
Acacias of Western Australia
Taxa named by Carl Meissner
Plants described in 1844